Asadabad (also Romanized as Asadābād) is a village in Sonbolabad Rural District, Soltaniyeh District, Abhar County, Zanjan Province, Iran. At the 2006 census, its population was 147, in 41 families.

References 

Populated places in Abhar County